The Institute of Commercial Management (ICM), founded in 1979, is a professional body for Commercial and Business Development Managers, and an Examining and Awarding body for business and management students.

The institute is categorized as a not-for-profit organization - Registered Educational Charity, and its International Headquarters are situated at Ringwood, Hampshire, England - UK. 
 
ICM is recognised as an awarding organization by   The Office of Qualifications and Examinations Regulation (Ofqual) - The UK regulatory body for public examinations and publicly funded qualifications.

See also 
 Commercial management

References

External links 
 ICM website

Non-profit organisations based in the United Kingdom
Organizations established in 1979
Organisations based in Hampshire